Bausele is an Australian manufacturer of watches. It was founded in Sydney, in 2011 by Christophe Hoppe.

Bausele was the first and only Australian watch company invited to Baselworld.

Bausele has collaborated with the Sydney Opera House, Fokker and the Royal Australian Air Force.
Bausele is also a supplier of the Australian Army Intelligence Corps and Special Forces.

References

External links

Privately held companies of Australia
Australian brands
Australian companies established in 2011
Manufacturing companies established in 2011
Watch manufacturing companies
Clock manufacturing companies of Australia
Watch manufacturing companies of Australia
Luxury brands
Watch brands
Manufacturing companies based in Sydney
Australian military uniforms